Andrei Valentinovich Khripkov (born 30 June 1990) is a Russian professional football player. He plays for Kyrgyzstani club Dordoi Bishkek.

Club career
He made his Russian Football National League debut for FC Olimpiyets Nizhny Novgorod on 8 July 2017 in a game against FC Avangard Kursk.

On 14 January 2023, Dordoi Bishkek announced the signing of Khripkov to a one-year contract.

References

External links
 

1990 births
Sportspeople from Bishkek
Living people
Russian footballers
Association football midfielders
FC Zimbru Chișinău players
FC KAMAZ Naberezhnye Chelny players
FC Dynamo Moscow reserves players
FC Tekstilshchik Ivanovo players
FC Nizhny Novgorod (2015) players
FC Mordovia Saransk players
FC Irtysh Pavlodar players
FC Sokol Saratov players
FC Mashuk-KMV Pyatigorsk players
FC Dordoi Bishkek players
Russian First League players
Russian Second League players
Moldovan Super Liga players
Kazakhstan Premier League players
Russian expatriate footballers
Expatriate footballers in Moldova
Russian expatriate sportspeople in Moldova
Expatriate footballers in Kazakhstan
Russian expatriate sportspeople in Kazakhstan
Expatriate footballers in Kyrgyzstan
Russian expatriate sportspeople in Kyrgyzstan